The Blue-legged Sylvan Katydid (Zabalius ophthalmicus) is a species of katydid, endemic to the South Africa region. IUCN classes it as Least concern due to its widespread distribution.

References

Insects described in 1869
Tettigoniidae
Orthoptera of Africa